Green Mountain Transit Agency (GMTA) provides public transportation in central Vermont, specifically in Washington and Lamoille counties and parts of Orange County, expanding in 2009 to include Franklin and Grand Isle counties. Their bus routes connect the Capital District, Stowe, Lamoille Valley and the Mad River Valley.

GMTA had an annual ridership of 290,000 in fiscal year 2010, an average of 795 riders, 34 people per route, daily. There are 73 vehicles in their fleet, all of which have bike racks and are wheelchair accessible.

Trip planning is also available on all GMTA routes on Google Maps.

On January 22, 2016, it was announced that the Chittenden County Transportation Authority will be renamed to Green Mountain Transit, completing a merger with the Green Mountain Transit Authority to become a regional system. As of October 2016, the merger has been completed.

Route list

Fares
50% discount fares are available to children ages 6 through 17, seniors at and over the age of 60, and disabled passengers. LINK Express riders are not eligible for any discounts when riding such buses. Bus-to-bus transfers are also available, and are valid one hour after receipt and are not valid for round trips.

Capital District, Mad River Valley and Stowe/Lamoille

Single local fare $1.00
10-ride pass on local routes $9.00
Unlimited ride monthly pass on local routes $33.00
Single fare between towns on commuters $2.00
Single fare within towns on commuters $1.00
10-ride pass $16.00
Monthly commuter pass $67.00
Regional seasonal routes in Stowe/Lamoille are fare free

Franklin/Grand Isle
Single local fare $0.50
10 ride local pass $4.50
Unlimited ride monthly pass $16.50
Single fare between towns on commuters $1.00
Single fare within towns on commuters $0.50
10-ride pass $8.00
Monthly commuter pass $33.50

References

Bus transportation in Vermont